Laszlo Bela Kish (born László Béla Kiss) is a physicist and professor of Electrical and Computer Engineering at Texas A&M University.  His activities include a wide range of issues surrounding the physics and technical applications of stochastic fluctuations (noises) in physical, biological and technological systems, including nanotechnology. His earlier long-term positions include the Department of Experimental Physics, University of Szeged, Hungary (JATE, 1982–1997), and Angstrom Laboratory, Uppsala University, Sweden (1997–2001). During the same periods he had also conducted scientific research in short-term  positions, such as at the Eindhoven University of Technology (Netherlands, 1986, 1997), University of Cologne (Germany, 1989, 1990), National Research Laboratory of Metrology (Japan, 1991), University of Birmingham (United Kingdom, 1993), and others.

Education
He received his MS in physics from Attila József University (JATE), Hungary, 1980; and Doctoral degree in Solid State Physics, at JATE in 1984. He had no official PhD adviser, though his mentors were Laszlo Vize and Miklos Torok. He received a Docent in Solid State Physics (habilitation) from Uppsala University, Sweden in 1994. He received a Doctor of Science (Physics), from the Hungarian Academy of Sciences in 2001.

Research

His main areas of interest have been related to stochastic fluctuations (noise), especially those related to the relevant laws, limits and applications, including the addressing of new or open questions, or exposing fashionable misconceptions. He has/had been working in many related fields, (see his list of publications) such as 1/f noise and its models, stochastic resonance, high-Tc superconductors, noise at percolation and biased percolation,  nanoparticles and their lognormal size distribution, self-organized criticality, universal conductance fluctuations, the error–speed–power dissipation issues of physical informatics, noise as information and information carrier, chemical and biological sensing, secure communication, unconventional computation, vibration-induced fluctuation analysis of soils, electronic device noise vs its degradation, weight fluctuations of memory devices during/after writing/deletion of information, etc. He has often played the role of a critic. His inventions and co-inventions include fluctuation-enhanced sensing, SEPTIC method (prompt bacterium detection), secure communication with Johnson-like noise (Kish cypher), speed–error–energy limits of computers, zero-signal-power communication, "information theoretically secure computer hardware", noise-based logic, Electrical noise engines and others.

Public activity

He was the founding editor-in-chief of Fluctuation and Noise Letters (2001–2008), where he is currently Honorary Editor (2009–present). Kish is the founder of the international conference series Unsolved Problems of Noise (held at various locations at every 3rd years since 1996 when he chaired the first meeting). He is co-founder of SPIE's international conference series Fluctuations and Noise (with D. Abbott) and the Hot Topics of Physical Informatics (HotPI) conference series (with David K. Ferry and He Wen). He coauthored the HTML document available for download from the internet,  The Dancer and the Piper: Resolving Problems with Government Research Contracting.

Honors

He was the recipient of the year 2001 Benzelius Prize of the Royal Society of Science of Sweden for his activities on fluctuation-enhanced chemical sensing. In 2011, he received the title of Honorary  Doctor (Honoris Causa) from Uppsala University, Sweden for his achievement in "research and technical applications of random fluctuations and noise."  In 2012, he received the title of Honorary Doctor (Honoris Causa) from the University of Szeged for his "outstanding research work and achievements."

See also

 Noise-based logic
 Fluctuation-enhanced sensing
 Sensing of phage-triggered ion cascades (SEPTIC)
Fluctuation and Noise Letters
Quantum Aspects of Life

References

External links
 
 Myth-busting in Physics and Information Technology, webpage at Texas A&M University
 Kirchhoff-Law-Johnson-Noise (KLJN) secure key exchange
Kish's homepage
News article on Kish's honorary doctor conferment at Uppsala University
News article on Kish's honorary doctor conferment at University of Szeged
 Electrical noise engines and demons
Kish cypher book
MIT Technology Review feature article about the Kish cypher
 Hot Topics of Physical Informatics (HotPI)
Noise/energy limits computation
Johnson noise engines and demons
Unconditionally secure computer hardware

1955 births
21st-century American physicists
American electrical engineers
Hungarian electrical engineers
20th-century Hungarian physicists
Living people
People from Texas
People from Szeged
Probability theorists
Texas A&M University faculty
University of Szeged alumni
Uppsala University alumni
Academic staff of Uppsala University
Hungarian emigrants to the United States
Academics of the University of Birmingham